The SP-71 is a highway in the southeastern part of the state of São Paulo in Brazil.  The highway is known as the Rodovia Convenção meaning convention in Portuguese in which it happened, an expressway linking Itu and Salto.

Highways in São Paulo (state)

pt:SP-70